Brian Janssen (born 10 August 1962) is an Australian professional light/light welter/welter/light middleweight boxer of the 1980s who won the Queensland (Australia) State light welterweight title, Australian light welterweight title, Australian welterweight title, and Commonwealth welterweight title, his professional fighting weight varied from , i.e. lightweight to , i.e. light middleweight.

Janssen was inducted into the Australian National Boxing Hall of Fame in 2014 under the moderns category

References

External links

1962 births
Lightweight boxers
Light-middleweight boxers
Light-welterweight boxers
Living people
Place of birth missing (living people)
Sportsmen from Queensland
Welterweight boxers
Australian male boxers
Boxers from Brisbane
Commonwealth Boxing Council champions